Jędrzej Maćkowiak (born 17 October 1992) is a Polish volleyball player, a member of Polish club Krispol Września, 2014 Polish Champion.

Career
Maćkowiak is an alumnus of Skra Bełchatów. He debuted in first squad of PGE Skra in season 2012/2013. On May 27, 2014 his team won a title of Polish Champion after final matches against Asseco Resovia Rzeszów. In June 2014 went to Effector Kielce.

Sporting achievements

Clubs

National championships
 2012/2013  Polish SuperCup2012, with PGE Skra Bełchatów
 2013/2014  Polish Championship, with PGE Skra Bełchatów

References

External links
 PlusLiga profile

1992 births
Living people
Sportspeople from Bełchatów
Sportspeople from Łódź Voivodeship
Polish men's volleyball players
Polish Champions of men's volleyball
Skra Bełchatów players
Effector Kielce players